Nandi may be:

Naandi language of Kenya, a Nilotic language also known as Cemual
One of the other Nandi languages
Nande language of Tanzania, a Bantu language also known as Ndandi